Little Busters! and Little Busters! Ecstasy are visual novels developed by Key and published by VisualArt's in 2007 and 2008. The story follows Riki Naoe, a high school student and member of a close-knit group of friends who call themselves the Little Busters. It was adapted by J.C.Staff into two anime television series broadcast between 2012 and 2013, and an original video animation series to be released in 2014, directed by Yoshiki Yamakawa with music direction by Shinji Orito. The discography of Little Busters!, Ecstasy, and the anime adaptations consists of one compilation album, one EP, eight singles, three soundtracks, and five remix albums.

The core of the discography consists of two original soundtrack albums for the visual novels, one for Little Busters! and the other for Ecstasy. The soundtracks were produced by Key Sounds Label and released in 2007 and 2008. The music on the soundtracks was mainly composed and arranged by Jun Maeda, Shinji Orito, Magome Togoshi, Manack, and PMMK. The third soundtrack album is for the Little Busters! Refrain anime series. Five remix albums were released for the two games between 2007 and 2013. An EP for Little Busters! was released in 2008 covering three pieces of theme music used in the game as well as remix versions of those songs. A compilation album mainly containing previously released vocal tracks for the visual novels and anime adaptations was released in 2014. Eight singles were released between 2007 and 2013: a theme song single for Little Busters!; four image song singles covering the characters Rin Natsume, Saya Tokido, Kanata Futaki, and Sasami Sasasegawa; and three theme song singles for the anime series adaptations.

Albums

Semicrystalline.
Semicrystalline. is an arrange album which contains a selection of songs from the visual novel Little Busters!, remixed by Rintaro Iwashita of PMMK. The album is otherwise composed, and produced by Jun Maeda and members of PMMK. The album came with the subtitle: "Little Busters! original arrange album". This album was released as a bonus item, included with the limited edition first printing of the PC version of the game released on July 27, 2007 by Key Sounds Label bearing the catalog number KSLA-0032. As a result, it was not released for individual sale. Of the ten tracks on the one-disc album, eight are remixed background music from the game while the last two are remix versions of "Little Busters!" and "Haruka Kanata", two songs originally featured on the "Little Busters!" single. The last track, "Replicato", uses a portion of the ninth track "Haruka Kanata (Semicrystalline. remix)" played in reverse.

Little Busters! Original Soundtrack
The Little Busters! Original Soundtrack, from the visual novel Little Busters!, was first released on August 17, 2007 at Comiket 72 in Japan by Key Sounds Label bearing the catalog numbers KSLA-0033—0035. The soundtrack was re-released on September 28, 2007, and contains three discs totaling fifty-three songs composed, arranged, and produced by Jun Maeda, Shinji Orito, Magome Togoshi, Manack, Ryō Mizutsuki, members of MintJam, and members of PMMK. Rita provides vocals for five songs, "Little Busters!" (plus remixes), "Haruka Kanata", "Alicemagic", "Amenochi Hare", and "Song for friends".

Rockstar Busters!
Rockstar Busters! is a hard rock arrange album with songs taken from the Little Busters! visual novel and arranged into hard rock versions. It was released on December 28, 2007 at Comiket 73 in Japan by Key Sounds Label bearing the catalog number KSLA-0037, and was re-released on August 15, 2008. The album contains one disc with twelve tracks all arranged by the rock group MintJam, and Terra, a member of the group, provides vocals for the eleventh track. Rita provides vocals for three songs, "Little Busters!", "Haruka Kanata", and "Alicemagic". The album is otherwise composed and produced by Jun Maeda, Shinji Orito, Magome Togoshi, Manack, and members of PMMK.

Little Busters! Analog Collector's Edition
 is an EP released on a gramophone record for the Little Busters! visual novel released on May 4, 2008 in Japan by Key Sounds Label bearing the catalog number KSLA-0041, and re-released for general sale on July 25, 2008. The EP features three of the theme songs from the visual novel in regular versions on the A-side, and remix versions on the B-side. The remix versions are from the second OTSU Club Music Compilation album released on February 29, 2008. The EP is composed, arranged, and produced by Jun Maeda, Shinji Orito, Yūto Tonokawa, Manack, members of MintJam, ZTS, Svenson, and Blasterhead.

Ontology
Ontology is an arrange album which contains a selection of songs from the visual novel Little Busters! Ecstasy, remixed by members of Key. The album is otherwise composed, and produced by Jun Maeda and members of PMMK. This album was released as a bonus item, included with the limited edition first printing of the PC version of Little Busters! Ecstasy released on July 25, 2008 by Key Sounds Label bearing the catalog number KSLA-0042. As a result, it was not released for individual sale. Of the nine tracks on the one-disc album, seven are remixed background music from Little Busters!, and two—"Neko to Garasu to Marui Tsuki" and "Kakeru"—are exclusive tracks of Little Busters! Ecstasy.

Little Busters! Ecstasy Tracks
 is a soundtrack containing the music tracks exclusive to the visual novel Little Busters! Ecstasy. The soundtrack was first released on August 15, 2008 at Comiket 74 in Japan by Key Sounds Label bearing the catalog number KSLA-0043, and was re-released on December 25, 2008. The soundtrack contains one disc with fifteen tracks composed, arranged, and produced by Jun Maeda, Shinji Orito, Yūto Tonokawa, and Manack. Rita provides vocals for four songs, short and long versions of "Little Busters! (Ecstasy Ver.)", "Song for friends (No Intro Ver.)", and "Alicemagic (Rockstar Short Ver.)". Lia provides vocals for the short and long versions of "Saya's Song". "Kakeru" is heavily sampled from the song "Hashiru" on the album Love Song.

Deejay Busters!
Deejay Busters! is a remix album of songs taken from the Little Busters!, Little Busters! Ecstasy and Kud Wafter visual novels and remixed into electronic dance music. It was originally released on May 8, 2011 at the Rewrite Fes. promotional event in Japan by Key Sounds Label bearing the catalog number KSLA-0068, and was later released for general sale on May 27, 2011. The album contains one disc with ten tracks originally composed by Jun Maeda, Shinji Orito and Jun'ichi Shimizu, and features ten separate remix artists. Of the ten tracks, 1, 2, 3, 9, and 10 are from Little Busters! and Ecstasy, while the others are from Kud Wafter. Four artists provide vocals for five songs: Rita sings "Little Busters!" and "Alicemagic", Miyako Suzuta sings "One's Future", Lia sings "Saya's Song", and Haruka Shimotsuki sings "Hoshikuzu".

Ripresa
Ripresa is a piano arrange album with songs taken from the Little Busters!, Little Busters! Ecstasy and Kud Wafter visual novels and arranged into piano versions. It was released on April 26, 2013 in Japan by Key Sounds Label bearing the catalog number KSLA-0089. The album contains one disc with ten tracks, eight of which are from Little Busters! and Ecstasy and the other two, tracks 5 and 9, are from Kud Wafter. The album is composed and produced by Jun Maeda, PMMK and Jun'ichi Shimizu; tracks are arranged by Keiji Inai and Manyo.

Little Busters! Refrain Original Soundtrack
Little Busters! Refrain Original Soundtrack is an original soundtrack containing music tracks featured in the Little Busters! Refrain anime series and was first released on December 29, 2013 at Comiket 85 in Japan by Key Sounds Label bearing the catalog number KSLA-0094. The soundtrack contains one disc with 17 tracks composed, arranged, and produced by Jun Maeda, Shinji Orito, Magome Togoshi, Ryō Mizutsuki, Manack, Kenichirō Iwasaki, Manyo, Nishi-ken and MintJam. Rita sings three songs: "Little Busters! EX (TV Size)", "Little Busters! (TV animation ver.) (TV Size)" and "Alicemagic (TV animation ver.) (TV Size)". Suzuyu sings two songs: "Boys be Smile (TV Size)" and "Mezameta Asa ni wa Kimi ga Tonari ni (TV Size)". Ayaka Kitazawa sings "Kimi to no Nakushimi Mono (TV Size)".

Little Busters! Perfect Vocal Collection
Little Busters! Perfect Vocal Collection is a compilation album of vocal music featured in the Little Busters! and Little Busters! Ecstasy visual novels and their anime adaptations. It was first released on April 29, 2014 at the Character1 exhibition in Japan by Key Sounds Label bearing the catalog numbers KSLA-0095–0096. It was later re-released for general sale on August 8, 2014. The album contains two discs with 23 tracks composed, arranged, and produced by Jun Maeda, Shinji Orito, PMMK, Leo Kashida, Luka, Manack, Manyo, MintJam, Nishi-ken, Terra, Arm, VWN, dj Aura Qualic, Yū Hagiwara and Anant-Garde Eyes. Singers on the album include: Ayaka Kitazawa, Lia, Rita, Harumi Sakurai, Keiko Suzuki, Suzuyu and Tomoe Tamiyasu.

Singles

Little Busters!
 is a maxi single from the visual novel Little Busters! containing three of the game's theme songs sung by Rita and was first released on May 25, 2007 by Key Sounds Label bearing the catalog number KSLA-0028. The single contains one disc with six tracks in regular and off-vocal versions. The song "Little Busters!" is the opening theme of Little Busters!; "Haruka Kanata" is an insert song; and "Alicemagic" is one of the ending themes. The single is composed, arranged, and produced by Jun Maeda, Shinji Orito, Yūto Tonokawa, I've Sound, Manack, and members of MintJam.

Rin no Hisoka na Koi no Uta / Mission:Love sniper
 / Mission:Love sniper" is an image song single for the Little Busters! visual novel, and was first released on December 28, 2007 at Comiket 73 in Japan by Key Sounds Label bearing the catalog number KSLA-0038, and was re-released on August 15, 2008. The single is for the main heroine Rin Natsume in the game, and contains one disc with four tracks sung by Tomoe Tamiya, the voice actress of Rin. The song "Mission:Love sniper" uses the same tune as Rin's theme song from the game, "Ring Ring Ring!". The single is composed, arranged, and produced by Jun Maeda, Arm of IOSYS, and members of MintJam. Track three was originally composed by Gustav Holst under the title "Jupiter, the Bringer of Jollity" from his orchestral suite The Planets. The track is called "Jupinyā" on the single as a portmanteau of "Jupiter" and the Japanese onomatopoeia for the sound of a cat meowing, "nya".

Saya no Nemureru Requiem / Saya's Song
 / Saya's Song" is an image song single for the Little Busters! Ecstasy visual novel, and was first be released on February 28, 2009 in Japan by Key Sounds Label bearing the catalog number KSLA-0047 at Key 10th Memorial Fes, an event held in commemoration of Key's ten-year anniversary. The single is for the heroine Saya Tokido, and contains one disc with five tracks sung by Harumi Sakurai, the voice actress of Saya.

Raison / Pickles o Oishikusuru Tsukurikata
"Raison /  is an image song single for the Little Busters! Ecstasy visual novel, and was first released on December 29, 2009 at Comiket 77 in Japan by Key Sounds Label bearing the catalog number KSLA-0049. The single is for the heroine Kanata Futaki, and contains two tracks sung by Keiko Suzuki, the voice actress of Kanata. Three of the tracks are short drama monologues of Keiko Suzuki playing Kanata.

Neko to Garasu to Marui Tsuki / Alicemagic (Aroma Tablet mix)
 / Alicemagic (Aroma Tablet mix)" is an image song single for the Little Busters! Ecstasy visual novel, and was first released on December 29, 2009 at Comiket 77 in Japan by Key Sounds Label bearing the catalog number KSLA-0050. The single is for the heroine Sasami Sasasegawa, and contains tracks sung by Tomoe Tamiyasu, the voice actress of Sasami.  is Sasami's leitmotif in Little Busters! Ecstasy, and "Alicemagic" is originally one of the ending themes from the visual novel. Two of the tracks are short dramas.

Little Busters! (TV animation ver.) / Alicemagic (TV animation ver.)
"Little Busters! (TV animation ver.) / Alicemagic (TV animation ver.)" is a single for the Little Busters! anime series by J.C.Staff, which was released on October 31, 2012 in Japan by Key Sounds Label bearing either the catalog number KSLA-0087 or KSLA-0088 depending on the edition. The former is for the limited edition, which came bundled with a DVD containing non-credit opening and ending videos for the anime, and the latter is for the regular edition. The single contains the opening and ending themes from the anime version in full length, TV length, and off-vocal versions. The opening theme is "Little Busters! (TV animation ver.)" and the ending theme is "Alicemagic (TV animation ver.)", both sung by Rita. Both songs are remixes of the theme songs featured in the original visual novel. The single is composed, arranged, and produced by Jun Maeda, Shinji Orito and Yūto Tonokawa.

Boys be Smile / Mezameta Asa ni wa Kimi ga Tonari ni
"Boys be Smile /  is a single for the Little Busters! Refrain anime series by J.C.Staff, which was released on October 23, 2013 in Japan by Key Sounds Label bearing the catalog number KSLA-0092. The single contains the opening theme "Boys be Smile" from the anime sung by Suzuyu in full length, TV length, and off-vocal versions. The single is composed, arranged, and produced by Jun Maeda and Manyo.

Kimi to no Nakushi Mono / Namidairo no Tsubasa
 is a single for the Little Busters! Refrain anime series by J.C.Staff, which was released on November 6, 2013 in Japan by Key Sounds Label bearing the catalog number KSLA-0093. The single contains the ending theme "Kimi to no Nakushi Mono" from the anime sung by Ayaka Kitazawa in full length, TV length, and off-vocal versions. The single is composed, arranged, and produced by Shinji Orito, Yūto Tonokawa, Leo Kashida, MintJam and Nishi-ken.

Charts

References

Anime soundtracks
Discographies of Japanese artists
Key Sounds Label
Video game music discographies